Etiwanda School District is a school district located in San Bernardino County, California that serves the community of Etiwanda, which is part of the incorporated city of Rancho Cucamonga, a portion of Fontana, and the remainder of the district is in San Bernardino County territory.

History
The district formed on May 8, 1883, and began as a single room at the southwest corner of East Avenue and Baseline Road. Its first two-room school, which opened in 1890 on the southeast corner of Victoria and Etiwanda Avenues, grew into a four-room, two-story brick school in 1912. The next renovation came in 1938 when the 1912 brick building was replaced with a more modern one story building. 

Etiwanda was one of three districts in the area: Perdew School District and Grapeland School District, which began in 1880 and 1892, respectively. Perdew closed and combined with Grapeland on September 22, 1899, and in 1901, Grapeland combined with Etiwanda. On May 5, 1919, students from Etiwanda district started attending Chaffey Union High School District for grades 9 through 12. A portion of the Etiwanda School District was annexed to the Fontana School District in 1948.

Schools
The Etiwanda School District is a K-8 District that also provides Special Education classes. The district has thirteen elementary schools and four intermediate schools. Each intermediate school has two, three or four elementary feeder schools.

Elementary schools
 Carleton P. Lightfoot Elementary School
 Caryn Elementary School
 Cecilia L. Solorio Elementary School
 David W. Long Elementary School
 East Heritage Elementary School
 Etiwanda Colony Elementary School
 Falcon Ridge Elementary School
 Grapeland Elementary School
 John L. Golden Elementary School
 Perdew Elementary School
 Terra Vista Elementary School
 West Heritage Elementary School
 Windrows Elementary School

Intermediate Schools
 Day Creek Intermediate School, a National Blue Ribbon School and receiver of the California Distinguished School award.
 Etiwanda Intermediate School
 Heritage Intermediate School
 Summit Intermediate School

School Board Members

The above information was pulled from San Bernardino Registrar of Voters

Dayna Karsch has never had to run against some one.

References

External links
 

School districts in San Bernardino County, California
School districts established in 1883
Education in Rancho Cucamonga, California
Education in Fontana, California
1883 establishments in California